Inclusive language avoids expressions that are considered to express or imply ideas that are sexist, racist, or otherwise biased, prejudiced, or insulting to any particular group of people and sometimes animals as well. Use of inclusive language aims to avoid offense and fulfill the ideals of egalitarianism; often the term "political correctness" is used to refer to this practice, either as a neutral description by supporters or commentators in general, or with negative connotations among its opponents.

Its supporters argue that language is often used to perpetuate and spread prejudice and that creating intention around using inclusive language can help create more productive, safe, and profitable organizations and societies.

Definition and use
Inclusive language aims to produce content that is accessible and credible to the widest possible audience. What inclusive language actually looks like varies based on standards in education, religion, and publishing. 

For media, inclusive language is often used to meet standards of journalistic objectivity. The Chicago Manual of Style states that "[b]iased language that is not central to the meaning of the work distracts many readers and makes the work less credible to them" while at the same time discouraging political use of inclusive language. Similarly, the AP Stylebook recommends journalists avoid obscenities, hate speech, and the like—even in quotations—to avoid both legal liability and giving undue credibility to biased viewpoints. Both guides recommend the use of phrasing like people-first language and singular they in certain cases.

Examples

The neurodiversity movement including the autism rights movement sees various neurological conditions not as diseases to be cured, but differences to be embraced, like left-handedness or homosexuality.  Proponents might object to calling autism a mental disability, and might prefer "neurotypical" to "healthy" or "normal". Sometimes the word "allistic" is used to refer to people who are not autistic.

Comments about personal appearance might be interpreted as lookism or sexual harassment, depending on the context.

Effects of political correctness and inclusive language 
Political correctness and inclusive language go hand in hand as both focus on the use of neutral terms and expressions that typically combats prejudices. These concepts affect the psychological and social forces of the everyday lives of people. Those who adopt the form of political correctness and inclusive language indirectly reject the possibilities of anything against these values. Many businesses and organizations cater to their mass audiences by choosing to indulge in or reject these ideologies. By choosing one or the other, businesses alienate themselves from the many possibilities of the opposing side. For example, companies foster a sense of equality using inclusive language like gender neutral terms, therefore reducing sexism for their customers and employees. However, they cast out those who do not believe in supporting the use of gender neutral terms which can either help or harm the company.

In return, many people who reject the use of these concepts outwardly express their opinions on them. It is deemed as "increasingly problematic in contemporary society" as its use has become common in today's world. This has led to clashes between people of both sides which has been criticized by many as they deem the use of these ideologies to lead to culture wars. Republicans and Democrats constantly battle with these terms as it is used negatively by the former and positively by the latter.

See also
 Bias-free communication
 Gender-neutral language
 Cancel culture
 Color-blind casting
 Euphemism
 List of politically motivated renamings
 Plain language
 Speech code

References

External links
 Guidelines for Unbiased Language (PDF Table) from APA Style manual
 'Allistic' Cambridge Dictionary

Linguistic controversies
Political terminology
Dysphemisms
Etiquette
Identity politics
Gender-neutral language
Discrimination